Priscilla Jane Thompson ( – ) was an American poet.  She has been widely anthologized as an example of early female African-American poetry.

She was one of four children of John Henry Thompson and Clara Jane Gray, both former slaves from Virginia. She came from an artistic family:  her siblings Clara Ann Thompson and Aaron Belford Thompson were also poets, and her brother Garland Yancey Thompson was a sculptor. Poor health prevented her from becoming a schoolteacher, but she wrote, lectured, and taught Sunday school. She never married, and lived with Clara and Garland in Rossmoyne her entire life.

Thompson self-published two books of poetry, Ethiope Lays (1900) and Gleanings of Quiet Hours (1907).  Her poetry covers a variety of subjects, including religion, slavery and the African-American experience, and small-town life.  Her love poems include both chivalric poems and love poems addressed to other women.  She used African-American dialect in a number of poems, including the 72-stanza long “The Favorite Slave’s Story."

Thompson died on May 4, 1942.

References

External links
  Works by Thompson

Created via preloaddraft
1871 births
1942 deaths
African-American poets
American women writers
People from Hamilton County, Ohio